The Dennison High School is located in Dennison, Ohio. The property was listed on the National Register on 2006-02-01.

History
The building was designed by J.K. Griffin, an architect from Canton in the Gothic style. The building was completed in 1928 and was known as Angel's Castle, named for William Hiram Angel, the superintendent.

The school began an experimental program in the 1930s for "special need students." This "school within a school" was designated as Primrose School and continued until 1954.

When the schools of the area consolidated, the building was used as the junior high school until it became an intermediate school. The school still functions in this sense today.

Exterior
The red brick building dominates its site. The school sits on top of a small hill towering over the road below. The property is lined by a stone retaining wall with a flight of stairs rising to the main entrance. The main entrance rests in an arched alcove. The surrounding facade is made up of stone and projects away from the main bulk of the building. At each corner of the projection is a rounded buttress. The stone ends in a decorative entablature. Central windows light the interior and are located in a recessed panel and are surrounded by two brick towers capped by stone projections.

References

School buildings on the National Register of Historic Places in Ohio
Gothic Revival architecture in Ohio
School buildings completed in 1928
Buildings and structures in Tuscarawas County, Ohio
National Register of Historic Places in Tuscarawas County, Ohio
Education in Tuscarawas County, Ohio
1928 establishments in Ohio